Caloplaca nivalis is lichen in the family Teloschistaceae. It is found widely around Iceland where it usually grows on Andreaea-mosses above cliffs. When performing a K spot test the apothecia turn red but the thallus does not change colour.

See also
List of Caloplaca species

References

Teloschistales
Lichen species
Lichens described in 1871